Two ships of the Royal Navy have been named HMY William & Mary:

 
 

Royal Navy ship names